Augusto Lauro  (29 November 1923 – 7 March 2023) was an Italian prelate of the Roman Catholic Church.

Biography 
Lauro was born in Tarvisio and was ordained a priest on 29 June 1947. Lauro was appointed Auxiliary bishop of the Diocese of Cosenza on 8 September 1975, as well as titular bishop of Bigastro, and ordained on 28 October 1975. Lauro was appointed bishop of the Diocese of San Marco Argentano-Scalea on 7 April 1979 where he remained until his retirement on 6 March 1999. He died in Cosenza on 7 March 2023, at the age of 99.

References

External links
 Catholic-Hierarchy
 San Marco Argentano-Scalea Diocese (Italian)

1923 births
2023 deaths
20th-century Italian Roman Catholic bishops
Bishops appointed by Pope Paul VI
Bishops appointed by Pope John Paul II
People from Tarvisio